Oleksandr Oleksandrovych Stepanov (born 7 July 1983) is a Ukrainian professional football coach and a former player.

Career
He made his professional debut on 24 March 2002 for FC Elektrometalurh Nikopol in the Ukrainian First League (tier 2) game against FC Vinnytsia. Previously Stepanov also played a game for FC Torpedo Zaporizhia in the Ukrainian Cup in 2000. Later briefly he also played for the third tier FC Vuhlyk Dymytrov. Since 2003 Stepanov stayed in regional competitions of Dnipropetrovsk Oblast in particular playing for FC Skoruk Tomakivka since 2009.

In 2010 Stepanov was appointed a manager of the Skoruk club as well as its sports school.

References

External links
 
 

1983 births
Living people
Ukrainian footballers
Association football midfielders
FC Elektrometalurh-NZF Nikopol players
FC Torpedo Zaporizhzhia players
FC Uholyok Myrnohrad players
FC Skoruk Tomakivka players
Ukrainian football managers